Pigot's Directory was a major British directory started in 1814 by James Pigot.

Pigot's Directories covered England, Scotland, and Wales in the period before official Civil Registration began and are a valuable source of information regarding all major professions, nobility, gentry, clergy, trades and occupations including taverns and public houses and much more are listed. There are even timetables of the coaches and carriers that served a town.

Parishes are listed for each area with useful information including the number of inhabitants, a geographical description and the main trades and industries of the area or town.

List of Pigot’s Trade Directories by date

List of Pigot’s Trade Directories by geographic coverage
Bedfordshire 1839
Cambridgeshire 1839
Cambridgeshire 1830
Derbyshire 1835
Durham 1834
Dyfed 1830 (Cardiganshire, Carmarthenshire and Pembrokeshire)
Essex 1839
Herefordshire 1835
Hertfordshire 1839
Huntingdonshire 1830
Huntingdonshire 1839
Kent 1839
Leicestershire 1835
Lincolnshire 1835
London 1839
Middlesex 1839
Monmouthshire 1835
Norfolk 1839
North Wales 1835
Northumberland 1828
Northumberland 1834
Nottinghamshire 1835
Rutlandshire 1835
Scotland and the Isle of Man (1837)
Shropshire 1835
South Wales 1835 (see also Dyfed, above)
Staffordshire 1835
Suffolk 1830
Suffolk 1839
Surrey 1839
Sussex 1839
Sussex 1840
Warwickshire 1835
Worcestershire 1835

References

External links
 . Includes digitized Pigot's & Slater's directories for England & Wales, various dates
 . Includes digitized Pigot's & Slater's directories for Scotland, various dates

1814 establishments in England
19th-century books
Directories
Public records